The Chicago, Rock Island and Pacific Railroad Rockets were lightweight, streamlined diesel-electric passenger trains built by the Budd Company. These six trains were the first streamlined equipment purchased by the Rock Island, as well as being its first diesel-powered passenger trains. Four of the trains consisted of three cars each, the other two each had four cars.

The stainless steel trains were each powered by an Electro-Motive Corporation model TA locomotive. Unlike many other early streamlined trains, the locomotives were not permanently attached to the trains.

The trains were articulated except for the observation cars. Later, as the railroad streamlined more trains on more routes, the list of "Rocket" trains grew.

The six trains as originally assigned were:

The Peoria Rocket, Chicago, Illinois to Peoria, Illinois
 Articulated 3 car set:
 32 seat Baggage-dinette-coach #400 Joliet
 60 seat coach #306 Ottawa
 76 seat coach #300 La Salle
 32 seat, 1 drawing room, parlor, buffet, observation car #450 Peoria
The Des Moines Rocket, Chicago, Illinois to Des Moines, Iowa
 Articulated 3 car set:
 32 seat Baggage-dinette-coach #401 Norman Judd
 60 seat coach #307 Grenville Dodge
 76 seat coach #301 Henry Farnum
 32 seat, 1 drawing room, parlor, buffet, observation car #451 L M Allen

The Texas Rocket, Fort Worth, Texas to Houston, Texas, offering an alternate schedule on the route of the Sam Houston Zephyr
 Articulated 2 car set:
 32 seat Baggage-dinette-coach #402 Dream Lake
 76 seat coach #302 Mesa Verde
 28 seat coach, lounge, observation car #452 Centennial

The Denver Rocket, Kansas City, Missouri to Denver, Colorado for less than a year, then The Rocket from Kansas City to Oklahoma City, Oklahoma from March, 1938
 Articulated 2 car set:
 32 seat Baggage-dinette-coach #403 Bear Lake
 76 seat coach #303 Mount Evans
 28 seat coach, lounge, observation car #453 Pikes Peak

The Kansas City Rocket, Minneapolis, Minnesota to Kansas City, Missouri (2 trainsets)
 Articulated 2 car set:
 18 seat Baggage-dinette-coach #404 Arrow Head
 76 seat coach #304 Chippewa
 28 seat coach, lounge, observation car #454 Minnesota
 Articulated 2 car set:
 18 seat Baggage-dinette-coach #405 Mesabi
 76 seat coach #305 Ioway
 28 seat coach, lounge, observation car #455 Missouri

References

External links
 
 The Peoria Rocket/The Des Moines Rocket - September, 1938 timetables and consists - from Streamliner Schedules

North American streamliner trains
Articulated passenger trains
Named passenger trains of the United States
Rockets (1937)
Diesel-electric vehicles
Railway services introduced in 1937
Budd Company